The Prophetic Herbie Nichols Vol. 1 is an album by jazz pianist Herbie Nichols featuring performances recorded and released on the Blue Note label in 1955 as a 10 inch LP.

Reception
Although originally unheralded at the time of release Nichols' Blue Note recordings have gained recognition as highly original and ground-breaking compositions and performances. The Allmusic review by Scott Yanow awarded Nichols' The Complete Blue Note Recordings, released in 1997, a five star rating and stated "The music is virtually unclassifiable, and although largely straight-ahead, sounds unlike anything produced by Herbie Nichols' contemporaries. Essential music".<ref name="Allmusic">Yanow, S. [ Allmusic Review: The Complete Blue Note Recordings: Herbie Nichols] accessed November 30, 2010</ref>  

Track listingAll compositions by Herbie NicholsSide A "Dance Line" - 4:24
 "Step Tempest" - 5:08
 "The Third World" - 4:08Side B''
 "Blue Chopsticks" - 4:20
 "Double Exposure" - 4:04
 "Cro-Magnon Nights" - 4:39
Recorded at Rudy Van Gelder Studio, Hackensack, New Jersey on May 6, 1955

Personnel
Herbie Nichols - piano
Al McKibbon - bass
Art Blakey - drums

References

Blue Note Records albums
Herbie Nichols albums
1955 debut albums
Albums produced by Alfred Lion
Albums recorded at Van Gelder Studio